George Brydges Rodney, 1st Baron Rodney (1719–1792) was a British naval officer.

George Rodney may also refer to:

 George B. Rodney (1803–1883), American lawyer and politician; U.S. representative from Delaware
 George B. Rodney, Jr. (1842–1927), United States Army officer; sixth commander of the Department of Alaska and son of George B. Rodney
 George Rodney, 2nd Baron Rodney (1753–1802), British soldier and politician
 George Rodney, 3rd Baron Rodney (1782–1842), British peer
 George Brydges Rodney (Royal Marines officer), British general

See also